Two ships in the United States Navy have been named USS Welles for Gideon Welles.

United States Navy ship names